Pelton Mill is a historic carpet mill located at Poughkeepsie, Dutchess County, New York.  It was built about 1834 and rebuilt after the fire of 1854.  It is a -story, three-bay brick building with a gable roof.

It was added to the National Register of Historic Places in 1982.

See also 
 Alexander Smith Carpet Mills Historic District: historic carpet factory complex in Yonkers, New York

References

Industrial buildings and structures on the National Register of Historic Places in New York (state)
Industrial buildings completed in 1834
Buildings and structures in Dutchess County, New York
National Register of Historic Places in Poughkeepsie, New York
Rugs and carpets